Big Brother All Stars 2014 was the third season of the all-star spin-off of Big Brother and the fourteenth season of the format in Bulgaria overall. It was announced on 11 November 2014 on the official website of VIP Brother 6. The format the same broadcasting schedule as in 2012 and 2013. It began on Nova Television on 19 November 2014, immediately after the VIP Brother 6 finale and lasted for a month, ending on 15 December. It featured housemates from previous seasons of the show, as well as participants from other reality formats. Todor Slavkov won with Katerina Evro as the runner-up.

Bulgaria was the second country to have three all-star seasons of the format.

Housemates
10 housemates entered the house on Day 1.

Bonka
Bonka Ilieva "Boni" was a contestant from VIP Brother 4 and The Magnificent Six 2 where she won. She entered the house on Day 1 and was the first evicted on Day 8.

Borislav
Borislav Zahariev "Bobi Turboto" was a contestant from VIP Dance where he finished second. He entered the house on Day 1 and was the second evicted on Day 13.

Emil
Emil Kamenov was a contestant from The Mole 2. He entered the house on Day 1 and was the fifth evicted on Day 24.

Hristo
Hristo Trifonov was a contestant from Big Brother Family. He entered the house on Day 1 and finished third in the finale on Day 27.

Kalina
Kalina Paskaleva was a contestant from Temptation Island. She entered the house on Day 1 and finished fourth in the finale on Day 27.

Katerina
Katerina Evro was a contestant from VIP Brother 2 where she finished fourth. She entered the house on Day 1 and finished  second in the finale on Day 27.

Nikolay
Nikolay Parvanov "Niki Kitaetsa" was the first officially confirmed Housemate on November 14. He was a contestant from VIP Brother 2 where he entered together with his former husband Azis at that time and finished on third place. He is currently heterosexually married with a child and wants to clear his homosexual past. He entered the house on Day 1 and finished fifth in the finale on Day 27.

Petya
Petya Buyuklieva was a contestant from Musical Academy. She enterthe house on Day 1 and was the fourth evicted on Day 22.

Plamena
Plamena Petrova was a contestant from Music Idol 2. She entered the house on Day 1 and was the third evicted on Day 20.

Todor
Todor Slavkov was a contestant from VIP Brother 3 where he finished third. He entered the house on Day 1 and became a winner on Day 27.

Nominations table

References

External links
 Official website

2014 Bulgarian television seasons
VIP Brother seasons
2014 Bulgarian television series endings